Ni Wenjun (died 1357) was a Chinese general of the Red Turban Rebellions who fought against the Yuan dynasty in the 1360s.

He served under General Xu Shouhui. One of Ni's famous subordinates was Chen Youliang, who later founded the short-lived Chen Han dynasty.

Ni Wenjun was later trapped and assassinated by Chen Youliang, who sought to thwart Ni's intended coup against their commander, Xu Shouhui.

Red Turban rebels
Generals from Hubei
Yuan dynasty people
14th-century Chinese people
People from Xiantao
1357 deaths
Year of birth unknown